Edgar Goldschmid (born 14 December 1881 in Frankfurt, died 26 May 1957 in Lausanne) was a German physician, pathologist and historian of medicine.

Career and work

Born to a Jewish family, he was a son of the banker and art collector Eduard Goldschmid, and attended the Lessing-Gymnasium in Frankfurt. He studied medicine at the University of Freiburg, the University of Kiel and LMU, where he was influenced notably by Otto von Bollinger. In Munich he earned his doctorate in 1905 with a dissertation on tuberculosis in children.

He worked at hospitals in Munich, London, Berlin and Geneva, before returning to his native Frankfurt. From 1913 he worked at the Senckenberg Institute of Pathology and was a close collaborator of the institute's director Bernhard Fischer-Wasels. He was an adjunct professor (Privatdozent) at the Goethe University Frankfurt from 1914 and associate professor of pathology from 1920. From 1920, he was a contributor to Handbuch der normalen und pathologischen Physiologie. His most important work is Geschichte und Bibliographie der pathologischen-anatomischen Abbildung, which was published in Leipzig in 1925. As a result of the Nazi takeover, Goldschmid emigrated to Switzerland and was Professor of history of medicine at the University of Lausanne from 1933. He had an extensive library and his house in Lausanne was decorated with paintings and art objects from his father's collection.

References 

German pathologists
Academic staff of Goethe University Frankfurt
Ludwig Maximilian University of Munich alumni
University of Freiburg alumni
University of Kiel alumni
German medical historians
Scientists from Frankfurt
1881 births
1957 deaths